Intersnack Group GmbH & Co. KG is a German snack food company that annually produces around 600,000 tonnes of snacks including potato chips, nuts, baked products and specialty snacks.

The company is privately owned and has in excess of 8,000 employees. Its annual turnover is €2 billion.

Notable brands of the company based in Düsseldorf include Hula Hoops, McCoy's, Pom-Bear, Chio Chips and Penn State. They own the Tayto Crisps company in the Republic of Ireland.

In December 2019, Intersnack and Philippine company Universal Robina formed Unisnack ANZ, a joint venture comprising Griffin's Foods and Snack Brands Australia. Intersnack held a 40% stake in the consolidated business. In August 2021, Universal Robina exited the Australian and New Zealand market by selling its remaining 60% stake in Unisnack ANZ to Intersnack.

References

External links

Brand name snack foods
Brand name potato chips and crisps
Food and drink companies of Germany
Manufacturing companies based in Düsseldorf